Lipocosmodes is a genus of moths of the family Crambidae. It contains only one species, Lipocosmodes fuliginosalis, which is found in North America, where it has been recorded from Quebec to Florida and from Illinois to Texas.

The wingspan is 13–15 mm. Adults are on wing from January to November.

References

Glaphyriinae
Crambidae genera
Taxa named by Eugene G. Munroe
Monotypic moth genera